The World Rugby Team of the Year is awarded by the World Rugby in the spring each year. From 2004 to 2007, the award was called the IRB International Team of the Year. In 2017 the New Zealand Black Ferns became the first women's team to win the award beating nominees England and the All Blacks.

List of winners

Other World Rugby Awards

External links
World Rugby Awards

Team